Damastion was an ancient city in the area of central Balkans, known for its silver coins dating back to the 4th century BC. It is attested only in Strabo who says that the city had silver-mines and locates it in Illyria. The ancient author reports that the city was under the authority of the Illyrian tribes of Dyestes and Enchelei, and that Aegina colonized it. At 356–358 B.C. the mines came under the control of Macedon.

The exact site of Damastion is not yet identified with certainty. Various sites in Serbia, North Macedonia and Albania have been considered as the location of this ancient town.

Location

Damastion was issuing silver in the form of coins bearing the head of Apollo on the obverse and a tripod with the inscription "ΔΑΜΑΣΤΙΝΩΝ" on the reverse. These coins have been found in many places in the Balkans, mainly in southern Serbia, north-eastern Kosovo, eastern North Macedonia, west Bulgaria, Shkodër in Albania and as far as Romania, Trieste and Corfu. They are dated in the 4th century BC. Most attempts to locate Damastion are based on the study of the coins and their distribution. One author, Dr Imhoof-Blumer, endeavoured to find modern derivatives of the name and assumed that Damesi, a village in Albania, could have been Damastion. There are a number of other hypotheses about its location somewhere near Resen in ancient Paionia, modern North Macedonia.

The most recent location that was proposed was at Serbian archaeological site Kale-Krševica, south-east of Vranje (southern Serbia)  where 5th-century BC foundations of an Ancient Greek urban town have been unearthed.

Dr. Petar Popović from the Institute of Archeology in Belgrade says that Kale-Krševica could very likely be the city of Damastion. He added that monumental building was found made from semicircular blocks 9m long and 3 m high. He estimated that only 5% was excavated and said that the town probably had 3.000 people.

Dr. Viktorija Sokolovska, Archaeologist, has located Damastion near Kosovska Mitrovica, on the site of Socanica, where many years ago have been discovered three epigraphic monuments on which is noted abbreviation MUN.D.D. on which she sees MUNICIPIUM DAMASTION DARDANORUM. (for reference see bibliography below)

History
The Illyrian state controlled the mines of Damastion at least from the 5th century BC. The silver mines of Damastion increased the interest of the Greeks in Illyrian territory. In the 431 BC Greeks from Aegina had colonised the city. In 4th century BC the city (Damastini its citizens) were subjects to Illyrian king Bardylis and its inhabitants were called the Damastini. The city was known in antiquity for its silver mines, whose exact location, like that of the city itself, is today unknown. The circulation of the coins of Damastion included Dardania (today's Kosovo and its surrounding areas) up to the west, to the southern Adriatic coast. The city and its silver mines were captured by Philip II of Macedon after he defeated Dardanian King Bardyllis.

See also
List of ancient cities in Illyria

Bibliography

Viktorija Sokolovska, Pajonskoto Pleme Agrijani i vrskite so Damastion, Maced. acta Archaeologica 11, Skopje 1990, 9-34. (with summary in French).
Viktorija Sokolovska, The localization of Damastion revisited, MACEDONIAN NUMISMATIC JOURNAL 5, Skopje 2011, 7-13.
Viktorija Sokolovska, USTE EDNAS ZA UBIKACIJATA NA DAMASTION, KOMENTARI Za nekoi prasanja od Antickoto minato na Makedonija, Skopje 2005, 69-81.
Viktorija Sokolovska, The Coinage of Agrianes, MACEDONIAN NUMISMATIC JOURNAL, No. 2, Skopje 1996, 13-22.

References

Illyrian Albania
Dardania (Roman province)
Geography of ancient Paeonia
Archaeology of Illyria
Archaeological sites in North Macedonia
Archaeological sites in Serbia
Former populated places in the Balkans
Greek colonies in Illyria
Cities in ancient Illyria